Hennersdorf (or Hennersdorf bei Wien; Central Bavarian: Hennasduaf) is a town in the district of Mödling in the Austrian state of Lower Austria.

Geography
Hennersdorf lies in the northeast corner of the district and borders directly on Vienna.

Population

References

Cities and towns in Mödling District